= City of Legions =

City of Legions may refer to:

- Caerleon in Monmouthshire, Wales
- Chester in Cheshire, England
- León in Castilla y León, Spain
